Sadao may refer to:

Places
 Sadao, Buachet - Buachet District - Surin Province, North-Eastern Thailand
 Sadao, Nang Rong - Nang Rong District - Buriram Province, North-Eastern Thailand
 Sadao, Phlapphla Chai - Phlapphla Chai District - Buriram Province, North-Eastern Thailand
 Sadao, Sadao - Sadao District - Songkhla Province, Southern Thailand
 Sadao, Tat Thong - Mueang Yasothon District - Yasothon Province North-Eastern Thailand

Other uses
Sadao (given name), a masculine Japanese given name
Neem (in Thai: sadao; Khmer: sdao) a tree in the mahogany family Meliaceae